Los Llanos (Spanish for The Plains) is a historical term for the flatland area encompassing the Chilean Central Valley between Valdivia and Osorno. It includes parts of the communes of Paillaco, La Unión, Río Bueno, Osorno and San Pablo.  

Geography of Los Ríos Region
Geography of Los Lagos Region
History of Los Ríos Region
History of Los Lagos Region
Historical regions